Katie Loudon (born 6 July 1968 in Perth, Scotland) is a Scottish curler.

She played for Great Britain at the 1998 Winter Olympics.

Teams

Women's

Mixed

Private life
Loudon is from a family of curlers: her brother Peter is a World and European champion, her sister Edith was Katie's teammate, playing together at the 1998 Winter Olympics.

References

External links

1968 births
Living people
Scottish female curlers
British female curlers
Olympic curlers of Great Britain
Curlers at the 1998 Winter Olympics
Scottish curling champions
Sportspeople from Perth, Scotland